A list of films produced in Hong Kong in 2003:.

2003

External links
 IMDB list of Hong Kong films
 Hong Kong films of 2003 at HKcinemamagic.com

2003
2003 in Hong Kong
Hong Kong